Frisilia chinensis is a moth in the family Lecithoceridae. It is found in Taiwan and Sichuan, China.

Description
The wingspan is 12.5–13.5 mm. The species is superficially similar to Frisilia crossophaea, but it can be easily distinguished by the male genitalia.

References

Frisilia
Moths of Asia
Moths of Taiwan
Moths described in 1978